Hardy County is a county in the U.S. state of West Virginia. As of the 2020 census, the population was 14,299. Its county seat is Moorefield. The county was created from Hampshire County in 1786 and named for Samuel Hardy, a distinguished Virginian.

History
The first European known to visit this area was John Van Meter in 1725. The earliest permanent European settlements were established in the 1730s.

Hardy County was formed in 1786 from Hampshire County in Virginia.  It was one of fifty counties admitted to the Union as the state of West Virginia in 1863.

That year, the newly independent state's counties were divided into civil townships, with the intention of encouraging local government.  This proved impractical in the heavily rural state, and in 1872 the townships were converted into magisterial districts.  Hardy County was divided into three districts: Capon, Lost River, and Moorefield.  A fourth district, South Fork, was formed in 1873 from part of Moorefield District, and a fifth district, Old Fields, was created in the 1980s.

Hardy County has a rich African American history, with many free African Americans living there before the Civil War. This history is discussed in part 2 of the Henry Louis Gates television series African American Lives.

Geography

Through this county flows the South Branch Potomac River with its surrounding magnificent valley. Several miles wide, "the Valley," as it is commonly called, contains lands whose fertility lends itself to successful farming. Agriculture and stock raising have always been the main source of employment in this area, with corn, wheat, apples, peaches, melons, cattle and poultry having important interests. Truck-farming has a vital role, each household possessing its own small garden.

On either side of the Valley are high mountains with rough terrain and heavy timber. Throughout the area wildlife is plentiful, and hunting has always been a major diversion and source of meat supply.

The South Branch is a clear stream, quite wide, and of considerable depth in many places. Watering the Valley, the river abounds in fish and creates many picturesque settings. At times the usually calm waters surge from low banks and spread over the Valley, enveloping and ravishing the rich surrounding lands. The river has a peculiar feature in the field of geology as it flows through the Valley. At one point the river, thousands of years ago, did not cut across the mountains from one side to the other, but made a passage through them from end to end. At the present day, the gorge is several hundred feet deep, and the South Branch flows in a narrow channel at the bottom, with almost perpendicular walls of rock on either side.

In the very center of the South Branch Valley, surrounded by high mountains, and located on the east side of the junction of the South Fork South Branch Potomac River and the South Branch Potomac, is Moorefield, the county seat of Hardy County. A quiet farming center in 1860, the population of the Moorefield area at that time was about 1,500. At this period there were no bridges at Moorefield, and the South Branch had to be forded some  up the Valley, or the ferryboat, which was usually busy, had to be used. The main towns that communicated with Moorefield were Petersburg, Romney, and New Creek (presently Keyser) the latter having a stage line between the two points.

Major highways

 U.S. Highway 48
 U.S. Highway 220
 West Virginia Route 28
 West Virginia Route 29
 West Virginia Route 55
 West Virginia Route 59
 West Virginia Route 259

Adjacent counties
Hampshire County (north)
Frederick County, Virginia (east)
Shenandoah County, Virginia (southeast)
Rockingham County, Virginia (south)
Pendleton County (southwest)
Grant County (west)

National protected areas
George Washington National Forest (part)
United States National Radio Quiet Zone (part)

Demographics

2000 census
As of the census of 2000, there were 12,669 people, 5,204 households, and 3,564 families living in the county. The population density was 22 people per square mile (8/km2). There were 7,115 housing units at an average density of 12 per square mile (5/km2). The racial makeup of the county was 96.87% White, 1.93% Black or African American, 0.16% Native American, 0.14% Asian, 0.23% from other races, and 0.67% from two or more races. 0.66% of the population were Hispanic or Latino of any race.

There were 5,204 households, out of which 29.60% had children under the age of 18 living with them, 56.10% were married couples living together, 8.60% had a female householder with no husband present, and 31.50% were non-families. 27.00% of all households were made up of individuals, and 12.20% had someone living alone who was 65 years of age or older. The average household size was 2.42 and the average family size was 2.92.

In the county, the population was spread out, with 23.30% under the age of 18, 7.60% from 18 to 24, 28.80% from 25 to 44, 25.40% from 45 to 64, and 14.90% who were 65 years of age or older. The median age was 39 years. For every 100 females there were 97.50 males. For every 100 females age 18 and over, there were 96.70 males.

The median income for a household in the county was $31,846, and the median income for a family was $37,003. Males had a median income of $28,032 versus $18,798 for females. The per capita income for the county was $15,859. About 10.50% of families and 13.10% of the population were below the poverty line, including 13.10% of those under age 18 and 20.20% of those age 65 or over.

2010 census
As of the 2010 United States census, there were 14,025 people, 5,818 households, and 3,900 families living in the county. The racial makeup of the county was 93.8% white, 2.5% black or African American, 1.0% Asian, 0.2% American Indian, 1.5% from other races, and 1.0% from two or more races. Those of Hispanic or Latino origin made up 3.4% of the population. In terms of ancestry, 42.7% were German, 13.2% were English, 11.0% were American, and 9.9% were Irish.

Of the 5,818 households, 29.0% had children under the age of 18 living with them, 52.0% were married couples living together, 10.0% had a female householder with no husband present, 33.0% were non-families, and 27.0% of all households were made up of individuals. The average household size was 2.40 and the average family size was 2.86. The median age was 42.8 years.

The median income for a household in the county was $31,347 and the median income for a family was $41,401. Males had a median income of $37,506 versus $23,865 for females. The per capita income for the county was $16,944. About 11.1% of families and 14.9% of the population were below the poverty line, including 21.9% of those under age 18 and 14.0% of those age 65 or over.

Politics
During the Virginia Secession Convention, Hardy County voted against secession from the United States, but much of this vote was within fiercely Unionist and overwhelmingly Republican Grant County, which was detached from it after the war. Following the detachment of Grant – which was frequently to be among the nation's most Republican counties in the subsequent century and a half – Hardy County became solidly Democratic, not voting for any Republican candidate between 1868 and 1964 inclusive. However, since 1968, Hardy County has voted for the Republican presidential candidate in every election with the exceptions of Jimmy Carter in 1976 and Bill Clinton in 1996. Since 2000, it has seen the same significant increase in Republican support as the rest of socially conservative West Virginia.

Communities

Towns
Moorefield (county seat)
Wardensville

Magisterial Districts
Capon
Lost River
Moorefield
Old Fields
South Fork

Unincorporated communities

Arkansas
Baker
Basore
Bass
Baughman Settlement
Bean Settlement
Brake
Cunningham
Durgon
Fisher
Flats
Fort Run
Inkerman
Kessel
Lost City
Lost River
Mathias
McCauley
McNeill
Milam
Needmore
Old Fields
Perry
Peru
Rig
Rock Oak
Rockland
Tannery
Taylor
Walnut Bottom

See also
 Lost River State Park
 National Register of Historic Places listings in Hardy County, West Virginia
 South Branch Wildlife Management Area

References

External links
 WVGenweb Hardy County Genealogy page

 
1786 establishments in Virginia
West Virginia counties on the Potomac River
Populated places established in 1786
Counties of Appalachia